There are numerous wild edible and medicinal plants in British Columbia that are used traditionally by First Nations peoples. These include seaweeds, rhizomes and shoots of flowering plants, berries, and fungi.

History 
Almost all major groups of wild plants in British Columbia have edible members that are reported to have been used by the First Nations peoples. Many are still used today. Native plants of B.C. largely contributed to the diets of First Nations peoples of this area before these people and their land were colonized.

Seaweed 
Seaweed has been an important plant for many First Nations peoples of British Columbia. Along the coast, families still travel out to seaweed beds that have provided food for thousands of years. Dried red laver (Porphyra abbottiae Krishnamurthy) is a type of edible seaweed. Laver is usually gathered in great amounts in Spring. They were used traditionally by virtually all the coastal groups, with the possible exception of some Nuu-chah-nulth, or Westcoast peoples, and some Salishan peoples of Vancouver Island, and various species were used. They are harvested at their young growing stage in the spring, usually around May, the exact time depending on latitude, local conditions, and type of laver. Older plants were too tough to be eaten. Traditionally, women were seaweed harvesters. Working from canoes, women would pull seaweed from the rocks until their canoes were full. At the beach it would be piled up, covered with mats and then finally dried on cedarwood frames, where is would hang to dry for 2–3 days. Sometimes it would be hung out for only one day, and then moved to the smokehouse for the remaining time. Lightly smoked, it was found to take on a unique flavor.

The Kwakwaka'wakw (Kwakwala speaking villages), for example, traditionally prepared cakes of red laver by covering the harvested seaweed and allowing it to decompose for 4–5 days, then pressing it into wood frames and drying it in the sun. The resulting cakes were then placed in cedar-wood boxes in layers alternating with layers of chiton juice (obtained by chewing the chiton and spitting out the saliva) and young boughs of red-cedar (Thuja plicata). When the box was filled, it was weighted with several large rocks, tied down with rope, and left for about a month. Then the entire process was repeated, altogether four times. Finally, the cakes were packed in a box without cedar boughs and stored for winter, when they were eaten with smoked salmon at tribal feasts. At this time, they were torn into strips, chopped with adzes, chewed, and put into a large dish. Water was poured overtop, and the seaweed was stirred and allowed to boil for a long time. Then eulachon oil was added and the mixture was served in small dishes and eaten with spoons by the guests. The Haida used a similar method, leaving piles of the harvested seaweed to ferment for a few days before drying it. Dried seaweed cakes were chopped or shredded into pieces, then boiled or used in soups and stews. Kwakwaka'wakw people sometimes dried and toasted individual sheets of the seaweed on a rack over the fire, then powdered it and boiled it with water. The simplest method of curing the seaweed, most commonly used at present, is to spread it out on rocks in the sun. When dry, it is broken into small pieces and stored. It is then eaten dry, as a snack, or cooked in a variety of dishes. It is commonly mixed or cooked with eulachon oil, halibut heads, clams, fat of deer, bear or seal, or with salmon or salmon eggs. One contemporary innovation is creamed corn with seaweed. Dried seaweed is a common trade item among various families and communities.

Roots, sprouts, leaves, and rhizomes
Berries and seaweeds are widely eaten by the First Nations peoples of British Columbia. Traditionally, root vegetables held a very high status in First Nations food systems. Root vegetables were important for food, ceremonial and economic reasons. Some nations held a First Roots ceremony to show respect for the roots before the community went digging for their needs. Roots were dried in large quantities, traded from one place to another and were kept as a "back-up" in times of food shortage. For example, during the summer months, St'at'imc, Nlaka'pamux and Secwepemc women would dig the corms of yellow glacier lily (Erythronium grandiflorum). Families would gather upwards of 2000 lbs. The corms were cleaned then steamed or pit-cooked. Large quantities of yellow glacier lily roots would be dried for later use or for trade. In addition, Camas used to be an important staple across Southern BC. Access to and the use of camas by Interior communities was made possible through trade from the peoples of what is now northern Washington. Large camas beds on southern Vancouver Island and the Gulf Islands were kept free of invading plants through regular clearing and burning. Traditionally, for the Kwakwaka'wakw village of Haada, trade in root vegetables (springbank clover (Trifolium wormskioldii), silverweed and northern riceroot (Fritillaria camschatcensis) with the Nuxalk and Heiltsuk was an important part of their regional economy.

Berries 
For thousands of years, over 30 types of berries have been harvested in traditional territories of British Columbia from early summer (soapberries, salmonberries, thimbleberries), to late fall (cranberries, crabapples), depending on the berry type and location. Berries were an important part of traditional knowledge. First Nations peoples were shown when the berries were ripe by listening and observing the changes in the animals and plants. The wild rose blooming announced the readiness of sxusem (soapberries) for Nlaka'pamux.  The song of Swainson's thrush heralded the ripening of salmonberries for Tlingit, Tsimshian, Haida, Haisla, Oweekeno, Squamish, Nuu-chah-nulth, Ditidaht, and Northern Straits Salish people. Soapberries hold a high place and have  a lasting taste memory. Saponins in the soapberries allow them to be whipped up into a frothy 'ice cream' which was traditionally eaten in British Columbia. So-called 'Indian' ice cream has often been mixed in with dried meat, or may be served alone. Soapberries  have been mixed with sugar and added to carbonated water as an alternative to pop. Berries contain vitamin C, fibre, and carbohydrates.

Traditionally harvested berries

North Coast: bunchberries, blueberries, cloudberries, cranberries, crowberries (mossberries), currant, gooseberry, blue elderberry, red huckleberry, salmonberry, thimbleberries (Rubus parviflorus), black hawthorn (jam/jelly), crabapple (jam/jelly), oregon grape (jam/jelly), soapberries, strawberry

South Coast: cranberries, red huckleberries, salmonberries, thimbleberries, oregon grape (jam/jelly), cherries, currants, blackberries, gooseberries, soapberries, strawberries

Southern interior: blueberries, cranberries, currants, blue huckleberries/bilberry (Vaccinium deliciosum), blue elderberry, soapberries, black raspberry, strawberries

Northern interior: blueberries, cranberries, blue huckleberries/bilberry, crowberries (mossberry), currants, bunchberries, saskatoons, and cloudberries.

Fungi 

Among the Northwest Coast peoples, despite the availability of innumerable kinds of edible mushrooms, few were recognized with names, and with some minor exceptions, few were eaten. In some coastal languages, such as Haida, there does not appear to have been even a general name for "mushroom." In the Nuxalk (Bella Coola) language, the name for mushrooms means "hats-on-the-ground". Sometimes 'puffballs' are associated with stars. In the Sechelt (Shishalh) language, Shashishalhem (/ʃáʃíʃáɬəm/), for example, their name translates as "star-excrement". In other areas, such as Nlaka'pamux (Thompson) Interior Salish, puffballs are associated with ghosts and corpses. Puffballs and some tree fungi (polypores) were used medicinally by Interior Salish and other peoples. In addition, the Interior Salish did eat approximately six different types of mushrooms traditionally and some Chilcotin people were said to eat certain types.

Considering the large variety and general abundance of different types of mushrooms and fleshy fungi available to First Nations peoples of British Columbia, it is somewhat surprising that so few were used traditionally as food. Possibly this is because it is difficult to distinguish toxic from non-toxic types. However, some First Nations peoples who did eat some mushroom species were certainly aware of, and had names for poisonous species as well. For example, the Nlaka'pamux Interior Salish recognized a whole class of "bad mushrooms," including at least one type called "hole-in-the-top," a Lactarius species (tentatively, L. resimus). It was said that if one ate this, (his) stomach would "swell up"; the only cure was to eat bear's grease.

Studies of edible mushrooms in the Interior Salish area of British Columbia have resulted in the collection and verification by mycologists of four traditionally used species:

Cottonwood mushroom (Tricholoma populinum), Oyster Mushroom (Pleurotus ostreatus; including P. sapidus), Pine mushroom (Tricholoma magnivelare) and Red Waxy Cap/Larch Waxy Cap (Hygrophorus speciosus). Other varieties eaten by B.C. First Nations peoples include: Chanterelle (Cantharellus cibarius),  Shelf Fungus (Ganoderma applanatum), Slippery-top (Hygrophorus gliocyclus), Morel (Morchella spp.) Jelly fungus (Tremella mesenterica) and St. George's mushroom (Tricholoma gambosum).

A list of  'safe' wild mushrooms of British Columbia include 

 apricot jelly mushroom
 bear's head tooth mushroom
 black mole
 blue chanterelle
 cauliflower mushroom
 chicken of the woods
 comb tooth mushroom
 common puffball
 fairy ring mushroom
 golden chanterelle (aka chanterelle)
 hedgehog mushroom
 hexagonal-pored polypore
 horn of plenty (aka black chanterelle, black trumpet)
 horse mushroom
 ink cap
 jelly ear (aka wood ear)
 king bolete (aka cepe)
 larch bolete
 lion's mane
 lobster mushroom
 meadow mushroom
 mica cap
 oyster mushroom
 red cracked bolete
 rosy gomphidius
 saffron milk cap
 scaly hedgehog
 shaggy mane
 slimy spike cap
 western giant puffball
 yellow swamp russula
 yellow-gilled russula

Most common traditionally harvested plants by First Nations peoples in B.C.

Some of the most important traditional plant foods of British Columbia include:
 Red laver
 Nodding Onion (allium cernuum Roth)
 Blue Camas (camassia quamash Greene)
 Chocolate Lily (Fritillaria lanceolata Pursh Fritillaria affinis)
 Bog Cranberry
 Cow Parsnip (Heracleum maximum)
 Wild Hazelnuts (Corylus cornuta)
 Red Elderberry (Sambucus racemosa)
 High Bush Cranberry (Viburnum edule)
 Soapberries (Shepherdia canadensis)
 Kinnikinnick (Bearberry, Arctostaphylos ova-ursi)
 Salal (Gaultheria shallon)
 Mountain Bilberry (Vaccinium membranaceum)
 Canada Blueberry (Vaccinium myrtilloides)
 Oval Blueberry (Vaccinium ovalifolium)
 Evergreen Huckleberry (Vaccinium ovatum)
 Red Huckleberry (Vaccinium parvifolium)
 Nettle (Urtica dioica)
 Springbank Clover (Trifolium wormskioldii)
 Wapato (Sagittaria latifolia)
 Stink Current (Ribes bracteosum)
 Coast Black Gooseberry (Ribes divaricatum)
 Saskatoon Berry (Amelanchier alnifolia)
 Coastal Strawberry (Fragaria chiloensis)
 Pacific Silverweed
 Wild Crabapple (Malus fusca)
 and Salmonberries (Rubus spectabilis).

References

Medicinal plants of North America
Flora of British Columbia
First Nations in British Columbia
Indigenous cuisine in Canada
Foraging